Notophyson heliconides is a moth of the subfamily Arctiinae. It was described by Swainson in 1833. It is found in Brazil, Suriname, French Guiana and Peru.

References

Arctiinae
Moths described in 1833